Mark Parry may refer to:

 Mark Parry (musician), Canadian guitarist
 Mark Parry (footballer) (born 1970), former Welsh footballer